The 1926 Boston College Eagles football team represented Boston College an independent during the 1926 college football season. Led by Frank Cavanaugh in his eighth and final season as coach, Boston College compiled a record of 6–0–2. Cavanaugh's former player, Tony Comerford, was hired as an assistant for the year. Joe McKenney was the team captain.

Schedule

References

Boston College
Boston College Eagles football seasons
College football undefeated seasons
Boston College Eagles footall
1920s in Boston